Cafe Cuts: A Collection Of Acoustic Favorites is an album released by San Francisco-based alternative rock band Stroke 9 on February 7, 2006. It is composed of acoustic versions of popular songs from their discography.

Track listing
 "Washin' + Wonderin'"
 "Little Black Backpack"
 "Do It Again"
 "Make It Last"
 "Vacuum Bag"
 "Letters"
 "Next Time"
 "Liar"
 "Tear Me In Two"
 "City Life"
 "Just Can't Wait"
 "California"

Stroke 9 albums
2006 albums